Axel Smith (born 27 June 1986) is a Swedish chess player and author. 

Smith earned the FIDE title of Grandmaster (GM) in 2016.

He is the author or co-author of several chess books including Pump Up Your Rating (Quality Chess, 2013) and The Woodpecker Method (Quality Chess, 2018).

References

External links 
 
 

1986 births
Living people
Swedish chess players
Chess grandmasters